Nationality words link to articles with information on the nation's poetry or literature (for instance, Irish or France).

Events
 February 18 – English Jesuit poet Gerard Manley Hopkins takes up a post as professor of Greek and Latin at University College Dublin in Ireland, where he will remain until his death in 1889 and write his "terrible sonnets".

Works published

Canada
 Isabella Valancy Crawford, Old Spookses' Pass, Malcolm's Katie, and Other Poems. Published at author's expense.
 James McIntyre. Musings on the Banks of the Canadian Thames. London, ON.

United Kingdom
 Francis Adams, Henry and Other Tales
 Robert Browning, Ferishtah's Fancies
 Andrew Lang, Rhymes à la Mode
 Amy Levy, A Minor Poet, and Other Verse
 Marc-André Raffalovich, Cyril and Lionel and other poems: a volume of sentimental studies, French-born author writing in English
 Algernon Charles Swinburne, A Midsummer Holiday, and Other Poems

United States
 Thomas Bailey Aldrich, Mercedes and Later Lyrics
 Louise Imogen Guiney, Songs at the Start
 Sidney Lanier, Poems, published posthumously
 Joaquin Miller, Memorie and Rime
 Edmund Clarence Stedman, Songs and Ballads
 Henry Timrod, Katie

Other
 Rosario de Acuña, Sentir y pensar, Spain
 Rosalia de Castro, En las orillas del Sar, Galician Spanish poet, writing in Spanish
 Lie Kim Hok, Sair Tjerita Siti Akbari, ethnic Chinese poet, writing in Malay
 Rabindranath Tagore, Bhanusimha Thakurer Padabali, Indian poet, writing in Braj Bhasha

Awards and honors
English poet Alfred Tennyson is created 1st Baron Tennyson of Aldworth in the County of Sussex and of Freshwater in the Isle of Wight, in the Peerage of the United Kingdom, hereafter being known as Alfred, Lord Tennyson.

Births
Death years link to the corresponding "[year] in poetry" article:
 February 14 – Kostas Varnalis (Κώστας Βάρναλης), (died 1974), Greek
 March 28 – Angelos Sikelianos (Άγγελος Σικελιανός) (died 1951), Greek poet and playwright
 April 2 - John Collings Squire (died 1958), English poet, writer, historian, and influential literary editor of the post-World War I period
 June 29 - Francis Brett Young (died 1954), English novelist and poet
 July 24 - Donald Evans (died 1921), American poet, publisher, music critic and journalist
 July 29 - Eunice Tietjens (died 1944), American poet, novelist, journalist, children's author, lecturer, and editor
 August 8 - Sara Teasdale (died 1933), American lyric poet
 November 5 - James Elroy Flecker (died 1915), English poet, novelist and playwright
 December 31 - George Sylvester Viereck (died 1962), German-American poet, writer and propagandist
 Date not known - Leknath Ponday, Indian, Nepali-language poet

Deaths
Birth years link to the corresponding "[year] in poetry" article:
 January 7 – John Harris (born 1820), English poet
 February 17 – Charles Stuart Calverley, 82 (born 1831), English poet and wit
 February 28 – Matsudaira Teru 松平照 also called "Teruhime" 照姫, literally translated, "Princess Teru" (born 1832), Japanese, late Edo and early Meiji period aristocrat and  skilled waka poet who instructed Matsudaira Katamori in poetry and calligraphy
 March 13 – Richard Henry Horne, 81 (born 1802), English poet, critic and journalist, and public official in Australia
 March 19 – Elias Lönnrot, 81, Finnish  philologist and collector of traditional Finnish oral poetry best known for composing the Kalevala, the Finnish national epic compiled from national folklore
 June 27 – Andreas Munch, 72 (born 1811), Norwegian poet
 December 3 – Jane C. Bonar, 73 (born 1821), American hymnwriter

See also

 19th century in poetry
 19th century in literature
 List of years in poetry
 List of years in literature
 Victorian literature
 French literature of the 19th century
 Poetry

Notes

19th-century poetry
Poetry